Marcus Annius Afrinus was a Roman senator, who held a number of offices in the emperor's service. He was suffect consul in July-August 66 with Gaius Paccius Africanus as his colleague. He is known primarily from inscriptions.

Bernard Remy states that nothing is known of his origins, but notes C. Castillo suggests Afrinus may have come from Hispania Baetica. The cursus honorum of Afrinus is imperfectly known. His first attested office was governor of the imperial province of Galatia from around the year 49 to 54; he is surmised to have been a popular governor, for his name and portrait appear on the coinage of Claudiconium. For reasons unknown, his advancement to the consulate was much delayed; according to the Lex annales, for non-patricians the gap between praetor and consul was 12 years, while it took Afrinus at least 17 years to advance to the consulate.

We know of only one office from the consular portion of his cursus. Afrinus was governor of the imperial province of Pannonia, immediately succeeding Lucius Tampius Flavianus in late 69, until the year 73. His life afterwards is a blank.

References 

1st-century Romans
Suffect consuls of Imperial Rome
Roman governors of Galatia
Roman governors of Pannonia
Afrinus, Marcus Annius